Almir Velagić (born 22 August 1981) is a Bosnian German weightlifter competing in the +105 kg category.

Velagić became a German citizen in 2000. He competed for Germany in weightlifting at the 2008 Summer Olympics, finishing 8th with a total of 413 kg.

At the 2009 European Championships Velagić won bronze medals in snatch and clean and jerk, and overall silver in the +105 kg category, with a total of 418 kg.

At the 2012 Summer Olympics, Velagić again finished 8th.

At the 2016 Summer Olympics, Velagić finished 9th in the super-heavyweight weight class.

References

External links 
 
 
 
 
 

1981 births
Living people
German people of Bosnia and Herzegovina descent
Sportspeople from Livno
Naturalized citizens of Germany
Bosnia and Herzegovina emigrants to Germany
German male weightlifters
Weightlifters at the 2008 Summer Olympics
Weightlifters at the 2012 Summer Olympics
Weightlifters at the 2016 Summer Olympics
Olympic weightlifters of Germany
European Weightlifting Championships medalists